Theorema eumenia is a Neotropical butterfly in the family Lycaenidae. It is found in Costa Rica, Panama and Colombia.

References

Theclinae